is a railway station on the Takayama Main Line in the city of Takayama, Gifu Prefecture, Japan, operated by Central Japan Railway Company (JR Central).

Lines

Station layout
Kuguno Station has one ground-level island platform and one ground-level side platform connected by a level crossing. The station is unattended.

Platforms

Adjacent stations

History
Kuguno Station opened on October 25, 1934. The station was absorbed into the JR Central network upon the privatization of Japanese National Railways (JNR) on April 1, 1987. A new station building was completed in March 2015.

Passenger statistics
In fiscal 2016, the station was used by an average of 209 passengers daily (boarding passengers only).

Surrounding area
Kuguno Elementary School
Kuguno Junior High School

See also
 List of Railway Stations in Japan

References

External links

Railway stations in Gifu Prefecture
Takayama Main Line
Railway stations in Japan opened in 1934
Stations of Central Japan Railway Company
Takayama, Gifu